This is a list of counties in the U.S. state of Kansas. Select from the links at right to go directly to an article, or browse the listing below for additional information.  Every license plate issued by the state contains the same two-letter abbreviation for the county in which its vehicle is registered.

Overview
Kansas has 105 counties, the fifth-highest total of any state.  The first counties were established while Kansas was a Territory from May 30, 1854, until January 29, 1861, when Kansas became a state.  Many of the counties in the eastern part of the state are named after prominent Americans from the late 18th and early-to-mid-19th centuries, while those in the central and western part of the state are named for figures in the American Civil War.  Several counties throughout the state bear names of Native American origin.

Wyandotte County and the city of Kansas City, and Greeley County and the city of Tribune, operate as unified governments.

The FIPS state code for Kansas is 20.

Alphabetical list

|}

Former counties of Kansas

St. John County was established in 1871, and formed from the area to the east of range 38 in what was then part of Wallace County. In 1885, the name was changed to Logan County.

Kearney County was established on March 6, 1873, and was dissolved in 1883, with the land area being split between Hamilton and Finney counties.  It was reestablished with its original borders in 1887, and organized on March 27, 1888.  In 1889, the name was corrected to Kearny County (without an extra "e") to match the last name of Philip Kearny.

See also
 List of townships in Kansas
 List of cities in Kansas
 List of unincorporated communities in Kansas
 List of census-designated places in Kansas
 List of ghost towns in Kansas
 Lists of places in Kansas
 Kansas locations by per capita income
 Kansas census statistical areas
 Kansas license plate county codes

References

External links 
 The Establishment of Counties in Kansas—Maps and text transcribed from Transactions of the Kansas State Historical Society, 1903–1904.

Kansas

Counties